The Rail Accident Investigation Branch (RAIB) is a British government agency that independently investigates rail accidents in the United Kingdom and the Channel Tunnel in order to find a cause, not to lay blame. Created in 2005, it is required by law to investigate accidents causing death, serious injuries or extensive damage. It also has authority to investigate incidents that could have resulted in accidents.

Creation and remit
The Cullen Report into the Ladbroke Grove rail crash in 1999 recommended the establishment of an accident investigation body within the Department for Transport along the same lines as the Marine Accident Investigation Branch and the Air Accident Investigation Branch, bodies that have distinguished themselves by their professionalism and objectivity.

In 2003 Parliament legislated – in the Railways and Transport Safety Act 2003 – to create the RAIB as an independent body charged solely with establishing the facts of the case and assessing and evaluating causes, but not apportioning blame or establishing liability;  nor does the RAIB enforce safety law or conduct prosecutions.

The RAIB became operational on 17 October 2005. with Carolyn Griffiths as its founding director. 
Before then, railway accidents were investigated by Her Majesty's Railway Inspectorate (which in 1990 became part of the Health and Safety Executive but is now part of the Office of Rail and Road), and the British Transport Police (if there were grounds for suspecting the commission of a crime).  Whilst the police must always be involved when there may have been a crime, the involvement of HMRI as the principal safety investigating agency attracted criticism on the grounds that the HSE might be investigating itself, if, for example, the HSE had approved a track layout or a signalling scheme later suspected to have been at fault.

The RAIB also satisfied the government's duty under European Union legislation (the European Railway Safety Directive 2004/49/EC) to provide an independent body that investigates rail incidents and accidents in a blame-free manner.

The RAIB has its remit laid down in law by The Railways (Accident Investigation and Reporting) Regulations 2005, which principally require the branch to investigate any accident or dangerous occurrence that results in:
 The death of at least one person;
 Serious injury to five or more people; or
 Extensive damage to rolling stock, the infrastructure or the environment.

The RAIB has authority to investigate any incident on the following railway transport systems, but especially investigates those that may have implications for railway safety or those that "...under slightly different circumstances, may have resulted in an accident":
 The national railway networks in the United Kingdom including Northern Ireland;
 The Channel Tunnel (in co-operation with its equivalent operation in France, the French Land Transport Accident Investigation Bureau);
 The London Underground, Glasgow Subway and other metro systems;
 Tramways;
 Heritage railways (including narrow-gauge systems over  gauge); and

Operation
The agency has two operational centres: one in Derby (The Wharf) and the other in the Farnborough/ Aldershot area, at Farnborough Airport. The Farnborough/Aldershot centre is Cullen House, adjacent to the Air Accidents Investigation Branch head office.

Previously its southern office was in Woking, Surrey. The move from Woking to Farnborough was scheduled for 2012.

The Chief Inspector and Deputy Chief Inspector operate out of both Derby and Farnborough offices. Each office has two inspectorate teams and its own operational support staff.

See also

Office of Rail Regulation
Health and Safety Executive
Air Accidents Investigation Branch
Marine Accident Investigation Branch
 Road Safety Investigation Branch

References

External links

RAIB website

Rail accident investigators
Public bodies and task forces of the United Kingdom government
2005 establishments in the United Kingdom
Department for Transport
Government agencies established in 2005
Organisations based in Derby
Organisations based in Hampshire